The 40th congressional district of New York was a congressional district for the United States House of Representatives in New York. It was created in 1913 as a result of the 1910 Census. It was eliminated in 1973 as a result of the 1970 redistricting cycle after the 1970 United States census.. It was last represented by Henry P. Smith III who was redistricted into the 36th District.

Past components
1953–1973:
All of Niagara
Parts of Erie
1945–1953:
Parts of Monroe
1913–1945:
All of Niagara
Parts of Erie

List of members representing the district

Election results
The following chart shows historic election results. Bold type indicates victor. Italic type indicates incumbent.

References 

 Congressional Biographical Directory of the United States 1774–present
 Election Statistics 1920–present Clerk of the House of Representatives

40
Former congressional districts of the United States
1913 establishments in New York (state)
1973 disestablishments in New York (state)
Constituencies established in 1913
Constituencies disestablished in 1973